Old Christ Church can refer to:

 Old Christ Church (Bethel, Vermont)
 Old Christ Church (Laurel, Delaware)
 Old Christ Church (Pensacola, Florida)